Phyllonorycter muelleriella is a moth of the family Gracillariidae. It is found from the Baltic States to the Pyrenees, Italy and Greece and from Great Britain to central and southern Russia.

Adults are on wing in May and again in August in two generations per year.

The larvae feed on Quercus cerris, Quercus petraea, Quercus pubescens and Quercus robur species. They mine the leaves of their host plant. They create a lower-surface tentiform mine, generally rather small and between two veins, touching the midrib. The lower epidermis has a single sharp fold. Pupation takes place within the mine in a cocoon that is attached to the mine on both the upper- and lowerside. Most frass is incorporated in the sides of the cocoon.

References

muelleriella
Moths described in 1839
Moths of Europe
Moths of Asia